The 59037/59038 Virar - Surat Passenger is a passenger train of the Indian Railways connecting  in Maharashtra and  of Gujarat. It is currently being operated with 59037/59038 train numbers on a daily basis.

Service

The 59037/Virar - Surat Passenger has average speed of 31 km/hr and covers 208 km in 6 hrs 45 mins.

The 59038/Surat - Virar Passenger has average speed of 36 km/hr and covers 208 km in 5 hrs 50 mins.

Route 

Coach composite

The train consists of 18 coaches:

 15 General Unreserved(GEN)
 2 Seating cum Luggage Rake(SLR)
 1 First-class Coach(FC)

Traction

Both trains are hauled by a Locomotive shed, Vadodara  based WAG-5P or Locomotive shed, Valsad based WAG-5.

Rake Sharing

The train shares its rake with 59039 Virar - Valsad Shuttle, 59040 Vapi - Virar Shuttle, 59045 Bandra Terminus - Vapi Passenger, 59046 Valsad - Bandra Terminus Passenger.

External links 

 59037/Virar- Surat Passenger
 59038/Surat - Virar Passenger

References 

Transport in Surat
Rail transport in Gujarat
Rail transport in Maharashtra
Slow and fast passenger trains in India
Transport in Vasai-Virar